Strojna is a dispersed settlement in the hills northwest of Ravne na Koroškem in the Carinthia region in northern Slovenia, close to the border with Austria.

The local church is dedicated to Saint Ulrich. It was built in 1848.

References

External links
Strojna on Geopedia

Populated places in the Municipality of Ravne na Koroškem